Neuroxena albofasciata is a moth of the subfamily Arctiinae first described by Herbert Druce in 1910. It is found in Cameroon.

References

 

Endemic fauna of Cameroon
Nyctemerina